Harbridge is a small village located some four kilometres north of Ringwood and a similar distance south of Fordingbridge, in southwest Hampshire, England. It is in the civil parish of Ellingham, Harbridge and Ibsley.

Overview
The village of Harbridge is at the edge of the low meadow land to the west of the River Avon. To the south lies Somerley, home of the Earls of Normanton.

History
The name Harbridge probably means "Hearda's bridge". In the Domesday Book of 1086, Bernard the Chamberlain held Harbridge from the King. Before 1066 it had been held by Ulveva. Harbridge is a referred to as a manor by the early 15th century. In the early 19th century the manor passed to the Earl of Normanton, and like nearby Ibsley and Ellingham became part of his estate of Somerley. Harbridge was a civil parish until 1974, when the parish was amalgamated with the parishes of Ellingham and Ibsley.

The church of All Saints consisting of chancel, nave, and west tower, was rebuilt in 1838. The tower retains its 15th-century masonry, but it was raised in the 19th century reconstruction. Coade stone was used for various decorative elements during its reconstruction.

Notes

External links

Ellingham, Harbridge and Ibsley Parish Council

Villages in Hampshire
New Forest District